The 9th Hussar Regiment (9e régiment de hussards) was a hussar regiment of the French Army. The 9th Hussar Regiment fought in the Napoleonic Wars, World War I and the Algerian War before finally being disbanded in 1979.

History
The regiment's ancestry is drawn from two separate units, one originating in a squadron of the Hussards de la Liberté and the other in the Régiment des Guides.

The Revolutionary Wars
Its origins lay in the Hussards de la Liberté, set up on 2 September 1792 and by a royal decree dated 23 November 1792. This unit was divided into two squadrons of 200 men each (the first squadron made up of volunteers from Paris and the second from volunteers from Lille) and came ninth in the army order of precedence by a decree of the French National Convention of 4 June 1793. On 25 March 1793, that unit's second squadron became the 10th Hussar Regiment (whilst on 1 May 1794 the first squadron of the Hussards de la Liberté became the 7e régiment bis de hussards). On 4 June 1794, after the defection of the 4th Hussar Regiment, the 10th Hussar Regiment was re-numbered as the 9th Hussar Regiment. In 1795, the regiment was involved in the Vendée Revolt. It was part of the Army of the Rhine in 1796 and the Army of the Danube in 1798. It was known as the Hussards Rouges or Red Hussars after its scarlet dolmans.

The Napoleonic Wars

It then formed part of the Grande Armée from 1805 onwards. In 1805, it took on the Third Coalition in the Battle of Austerlitz. 1806–07 made them take part in the war of the fourth coalition in the battles of Jena–Auerstedt, Stettin and Friedland, all in modern day Germany and Poland. In 1809 it took part in the war of the fifth coalition and charged at Eckmühl then at Wagramagainst the forces of Archduke Charles. In 1812 it took part in the French invasion of Russia, attacking at Borodino, and surviving the retreat from Moscow. In 1813–14  it took part in the war of the sixth coalition at the battles of Bautzen and Leipzig. When they were pushed back to the French Frontier, what remained of the regiment after the retreat through Germany was converted into the régiment de Berry-hussards (with precedence number 6) on 12 May 1814.

In The Industrial Age
On 27 September 1840, by decree of Louis Philippe I of France, the 9th Hussars was re-created out of detachments from the 1st Hussar Regiment, 3rd Hussar Regiment, 4th Hussar Regiment, 6th Hussar Regiment and 9th Mounted Chasseur Regiment. Its dolman was now black and it was nicknamed the Hussards Noirs or Black Hussars, a name it held until the proclamation of the Second French Empire. On 4 May 1856 it was disbanded.

Régiment des Guides
Meanwhile, in 1852, the Régiment des Guides was formed. On 1 May 1854 this became the régiment des guides de la Garde Impériale, and in 1871, became 9th Hussar Regiment.

World War I

The 9th Hussars were mobilized on 2 August 1914, commanded by Colonel Burette. The regiment was positioned between 14th and 21st Corps, fighting in the Battle of the Frontiers. On 19 September, the regiment was transported by rail to the Somme where it faced the 21st Prussian Corps. The 9th Hussars became part of the 1st Cavalry Corps on 21 October and participated in the Race to the Sea. Brought back to Amiens in December, the 9th Hussars were in operations on the Somme until August 1916. On 6 August 1916, the regiment was relocated to take part in the Second Battle of Champagne, as part of 14th Corps. The 9th Hussars attacked on 26 September, suffering heavy losses. After the offensive, the regiment was moved to Montbéliard. In response to the German attacks at Verdun, the regiment was transferred to the Meuse on 29 February 1916. In December 1917, the regiment was moved to the Somme again and left on 28 May for the Chemin des Dames. The regiment took part in the Battle of Malmaison from 16 August to 23 October. In November, the 9th Hussars were withdrawn and stationed in Villiers-Cotterets. In January 1918, the regiment moved to Alsace. As part of 14th Corps, the 9th Hussars retreated to the Somme after the German spring offensive in early April. The regiment participated in the Fifth Battle of Ypres in the last months of the war. The regiment was disbanded in 1922 at Chambéry, where it was then on garrison duties.

World War II and the Cold War
It was briefly re-formed in 1944, before being permanently re-created on 20 May 1956 at Sissonne to fight in Oranie. In 1962 it served as the garrison at Reims, before being disbanded on 1 June 1964, becoming the 18th Dragoon Regiment as the Reims garrison. On 1 July 1964 it was recreated for the Algerian War before being finally disbanded in 1979.

Commanders 
 1792: Jacques-Polycarpe Morgan
 1794: Chef de brigade Thierry
 1798: Nicolas Ducheyron
 1801: Chef de brigade Guyot
 1805: Colonel Barbanegre
 1806: Pierre Edme Gautherin
 1809: Colonel Louis Charles Gregoire Maignet
 1840: Colonel Francis Eustache Fulque
 1848: Colonel Morin
Commanders of the regiment of the Imperial Guard Guides
 1852: Colonel Fleury
 1860: Colonel de Montaigu
 1866: Colonel Joachim Murat
 1870: Colonel de Percin de Northumberlain
Commanders of the 9th Hussars since 1871
 1871: Colonel Friant
 1875: Colonel Gail
 1884: Colonel Plessis
 1889: Colonel Ozenne
 1898: Colonel Devezeaux de Rancougne
 1906: Colonel Bremond d'Ars
 1907: Colonel Villeneuve-Bargemon
 1912: Colonel Burette
 1918: Colonel Bezard
 1956: Colonel Lizeray
 1957: Colonel Delage-Luget
 1959: Colonel Chazelles
 1961: Colonel Tartinville
 1962: Colonel Abrial
 1964: Colonel Poumarede
 1965: Lieutenant Colonel Mazarguil
 1967: Lieutenant Colonel Royer
 1970: Lieutenant Colonel Lanurien
 1971: Lieutenant Colonel Aigueperse
 1972: Lieutenant Colonel Huon de Kermadec
 1975: Lieutenant Colonel Preaud
 1977: Colonel Dupont Dinechin

Bibliography 
 Ogier d'Ivry, Historique du 9e régiment de hussards, Valence, 1894 
 Historique des corps de troupe de l'armée française (1569-1900), Ministère de la Guerre, 1900
 André Jouineau et Jean-Marie Mongin, Les hussards français, Tome 1, De l'Ancien Régime à l'Empire, Paris, Éditions Histoire et collection, 2004
 Historique du 9e régiment de hussards - août 1914, novembre 1918, Paris, Charles-lavauzelle, 1920
 Livret d'accueil remis aux nouveaux Hussards lors de l'incorporation .( Provins 1970)
 Revue Gloire et Empire; Revue Napoléon Ier.

Cavalry regiments of France
Regiments of the Bourbon Restoration
Regiments of the French First Republic
Regiments of the First French Empire
Regiments of the July Monarchy
Regiments of France in the French Revolutionary Wars
20th-century regiments of France
Disbanded units and formations of France
Military units and formations established in 1792
Military units and formations disestablished in 1979
1792 establishments in France
1979 disestablishments in France